Afifa Iskandar Estefan  was an Iraqi singer throughout the middle of the 20th century. She was born on 10 December 1921 in Mosul, Iraq. She was considered one of the best female singers in Iraqi history. She was nicknamed the "Iraqi Blackbird".

Biography
Afifa Iskandar was born in Mosul to an Armenian father and a Greek mother. She lived in Baghdad, and started singing at the age of 5. At her first party in 1935, she sang Al maqam. At the age of 12, she married an Armenian man named Iskandar Estefan and took his last name. She also worked as an actress and appeared in many productions. In 1938, she traveled to Egypt to work with Badia Masabni, Taheyya Kariokka, and Mohamed Abdel Wahab. She died of cancer on 21 October 2012 in Baghdad.

Tribute
On 10 December 2019, Google celebrated her 98th birthday with a Google Doodle.

Singles

Iskandr sang nearly 1500 songs. These include:

 "Ya aqqid alhajibayn"
 "Ikhlas meni"
 "Ya sokari ya assali"
 "Ared Allah yebain hobty behom"
 "Qaleb qaleb'"
 "Jani alhlo labs sobhyat aledd"
 "Nem wa sadek sadri"
 "Msafren"
 "Qsma"
 "Helal eid"

References

1921 births
2012 deaths
People from Mosul
20th-century Iraqi women singers
Iraqi writers
Iraqi people of Armenian descent
Iraqi Christians
Iraqi people of Greek descent
People from Baghdad
Iraqi expatriates in Egypt